Cockscomb Hill is a conspicuous hill shaped like a cockscomb,  high, which rises through the glacier at the head of Mackellar Inlet in Admiralty Bay, King George Island, in the South Shetland Islands. It was first surveyed by the French Antarctic Expedition, 1908–10, under Jean-Baptiste Charcot, and named by Lieutenant Commander F.W. Hunt, Royal Navy, following his survey in 1951–52.

References
 

Landforms of King George Island (South Shetland Islands)
Hills of the South Shetland Islands